The Women's 49 kg weightlifting competitions at the 2020 Summer Olympics in Tokyo took place on 24 July at the Tokyo International Forum.

At the end, China's Hou Zhihui, India's Saikhom Mirabai Chanu and Indonesia's Windy Cantika Aisah sweeps the podium. They claimed gold, silver and bronze medals respectively.

Records

Results

References

Weightlifting at the 2020 Summer Olympics
Olymp
Women's events at the 2020 Summer Olympics